Marvin Worth (June 6, 1925 – April 22, 1998) was an American film producer, screenwriter and actor. His efforts to bring the biography of Malcolm X to the big screen started in 1967, when he purchased the rights to The Autobiography of Malcolm X, and eventually led to the production of the 1972 documentary, for which he received an Oscar nomination. Later on, he would produce Malcolm X, with director Spike Lee. He was nominated for an Oscar for producing Lenny in 1974.

Early life and career
Worth's career began at a very early age when he began promoting jazz concerts, which led to relationship with many artists.  At one time, he managed the musical careers of Charlie Parker and Billie Holiday.  Later, Worth's employment as an agent branched into comedy, and he took on contentious comedian Lenny Bruce.  In the 1950s, he forged a partnership with Arne Sultan and began writing material for Bruce. The duo went on to pen the scripts for Three on a Couch and Boys' Night Out and the story for Promise Her Anything. In 1958, Worth won a Peabody Award for his writing on The Steve Allen Show.

In 1971, Worth brought the story of Lenny Bruce to Broadway in the production Lenny, which won a Tony Award for its star, Cliff Gorman.(Internet Broadway Database)  In 1974 the movie version of Lenny directed by Bob Fosse was released and received multiple Academy Award nominations. For the remainder of his career, Worth continued to produce biopics including the 1979 film The Rose (loosely based on Janis Joplin), the 1996 television movie Norma Jean & Marilyn, the 1998 television movie Gia, and the 2001 television movie James Dean.

Personal life and death
Worth was married to his wife Joan, an artist, for 44 years. They had three children. On April 22, 1998, Worth died of bronchioloalveolar carcinoma, a form of lung cancer, in Los Angeles.

Selected filmography
He was a producer in all films unless otherwise noted.

Film

As an actor

As writer

Miscellaneous crew

Television

As writer

Script and continuity department

Thanks

Award nominations

References

External links

 
 
 

1925 births
1998 deaths
American film producers
American male screenwriters
American male film actors
Deaths from lung cancer in California
Peabody Award winners
American theatre managers and producers
20th-century American male actors
20th-century American businesspeople
20th-century American male writers
20th-century American screenwriters